The 2018–19 Texas A&M–Corpus Christi Islanders men's basketball team represented Texas A&M University–Corpus Christi in the 2018–19 NCAA Division I men's basketball season. The Islanders were led by head coach Willis Wilson, in his eighth season at Texas A&M–Corpus Christi, as members of the Southland Conference. They played all their home games at the American Bank Center, except for two games at the Dugan Wellness Center. They finished the season 14–18 overall, 9–9 in Southland play to finish in sixth place. As the No. 6 seed in the Southland tournament, they were defeated in the first round by Central Arkansas.

Previous season
The Islanders finished the 2017–18 season 11–18, 8–10 in Southland play to finish in a three-way tie for eighth place. Due to tiebreakers, they received the No. 8 seed in the Southland tournament where they lost to New Orleans in the first round.

Roster

Schedule and results
Sources:

|-
!colspan=9 style=| Non-conference regular season

|-
!colspan=9 style=|Southland regular season

|-
!colspan=9 style=| Southland tournament

See also
 2018–19 Texas A&M–Corpus Christi Islanders women's basketball team

References

Texas A&M–Corpus Christi Islanders men's basketball seasons
Texas AandM-Corpus Christi
Texas AandM-Corpus Christi Islanders basketball
Texas AandM-Corpus Christi Islanders basketball